The Greater Poland Civil War refers to the conflict that took place during 1382–1385 in the Greater Poland province of the Kingdom of Poland during the interregnum period following the transition of power between the Piast dynasty, Angevin dynasty and the Jagiellon dynasty.

Another name for the conflict is the Grzymała–Nałęcz Family War, as a major part of the conflict involved the struggle between the Grzymała and Nałęcz families (clans) for the dominant position in the Greater Poland.

The civil war
The death of Casimir III the Great in 1370 marked the end of the Piast dynasty in Poland. He was succeeded by Louis I of Hungary of the Angevin dynasty, who was Casimir's nephew. Louis' death in 1382, without a male heir, left a power vacuum (interregnum). Although the Privilege of Koszyce stipulated that one of his daughters would succeed him on the Polish throne, Louis' selection of his daughter Mary proved controversial, as her husband, Sigismund of Luxembourg, was not popular in Poland. The different factions in Poland could not agree on the succession, and a conflict erupted. The faction gathered around the Grzymała clan supported Sigismund, while the Nałęcz clan instead favored the Duke of Masovia, Siemowit IV.

As the clans in Greater Poland warred, those in Lesser Poland succeeded in gathering support for a different solution. In 1384, Louis' 10-year-old daughter Jadwiga was crowned King of Poland, upon the condition that the Polish-Hungarian Union was dissolved. Her coronation marked the end of most civil war hostilities; Norman Davies notes that "the disappointed candidates battled each other's candidacy into oblivion". As Jadwiga's fiance, William, Duke of Austria, was also unpopular in Poland, the Lesser Poland faction succeeded in arranging for her to marry Władysław Jagiełło (Jogaila), Grand Duke of Lithuania, in 1386. Jagiełło had just emerged victorious from a civil war in Lithuania. Their marriage began the period of the Polish-Lithuanian Union and the ascension of the Jagiellon Dynasty to the thrones of Poland and Lithuania.

The war is said to have been bloody; Davies writes of "much slaughter", and Sobczak notes that "entire clans perished in it".

See also
 Duchy of Greater Poland
 Warfare in Medieval Poland

Notes

References

Further reading
 
 M. Palczewski, Walka Siemowita IV o tron Polski (1382-1385), Prace Naukowe WSP w Częstochowie, Seria: Zeszyty Historyczne, nr 1, Częstochowa 1993, s. 7-21

1380s in Europe
14th century in Poland
Civil wars involving the states and peoples of Europe
Wars involving Poland
History of Greater Poland
1380s conflicts
Wars of succession involving the states and peoples of Europe